Purav Raja and Antonio Šančić were the defending champions but only Raja chose to defend his title, partnering Rameez Junaid. Raja lost in the first round to Scott Clayton and Evan Hoyt.

Quentin Halys and Tristan Lamasine won the title after defeating James Cerretani and Maxime Cressy 6–3, 7–5 in the final.

Seeds

Draw

References

External links
 Main draw

Wolffkran Open - Doubles
2019 Doubles